Óscar Ornelas Küchle (born Chihuahua, Chih., 30 November 1920 – died 2000) was a Mexican lawyer and politician and member of Institutional Revolutionary Party (PRI). He served as governor of Chihuahua from 1980 to 1985.

Óscar Ornelas was also a Magistrate (associate justice) of the Supreme Tribunal of Justice of the State of Chihuahua, Director of the Faculty of Law and Rector of the Autonomous University of Chihuahua (UACh). He also founded "El Colegio de Bachilleres" at national level, the first campus its name: Oscar Ornelas, in his honor. In 1974, he was elected  mayor of the city of Chihuahua. In 1980, he was elected to be the Governor of Chihuahua. In 1985, a conflict in the election for the Rector of the Autonomous University of Chihuahua degenerated in a political confrontation that occurred in which led to his downfall as governor. The following year, one of his main opponents was Fidel Velázquez Sánchez. Óscar Ornelas lost the support of his party and was forced to resign the governorship on 19 September 1985.

Recently the Library of the School of Law of the Autonomous University of Chihuahua was rebaptized with the name of "Óscar Ornelas Küchle"; he is, in fact, the only lawyer to have a commemorative plaque and statue on the University facilities.

References

1920 births
2000 deaths
Governors of Chihuahua (state)
Politicians from Chihuahua (state)
Institutional Revolutionary Party politicians
Autonomous University of Chihuahua alumni
Municipal presidents of Chihuahua
People from Chihuahua City
20th-century Mexican politicians